The 2015 World Table Tennis Championships mixed doubles was the 53rd edition of the mixed doubles championship.  

Kim Hyok-bong and Kim Jong were the defending champions but lost in the semifinals and secured a bronze medal.

Xu Xin and Yang Ha-eun won the gold medal in the final against Maharu Yoshimura and Kasumi Ishikawa by a score of 11–7, 11–8, 11–4, 11–6.

Seeds
Matches were best of 7 games in qualification and in the 128-player sized main draw.

  Kim Hyok-bong /  Kim Jong (semifinals)
  Jiang Tianyi /  Lee Ho Ching (fourth round)
  Lee Sang-su /  Park Young-sook (fourth round)
  Koki Niwa /  Sayaka Hirano (fourth round)
  Xu Xin /  Yang Ha-eun (champions)
  Omar Assar /  Dina Meshref (first round)
  Chen Chien-an /  Chen Szu-yu (fourth round)
  Yang Zi /  Yu Mengyu (third round)
  Chuang Chih-yuan /  Cheng I-ching (second round)
  Wong Chun Ting /  Doo Hoi Kem (semifinals)
  Emmanuel Lebesson /  Chen Meng (third round)
  Wang Zengyi /  Natalia Partyka (second round)
  Marcos Madrid /  Yadira Silva (third round)
  Steffen Mengel /  Petrissa Solja (quarterfinals)
  Paweł Fertikowski /  Katarzyna Grzybowska (quarterfinals)
  Suraju Saka /  Han Xing (second round)
  Yan An /  Wu Yang (quarterfinals)
  Kane Townsend /  Adriana Diaz (second round)
  Robert Gardos /  Liu Jia (second round)
  Maharu Yoshimura /  Kasumi Ishikawa (final)
  Quadri Aruna /  Offiong Edem (first round)
  Mattias Karlsson /  Matilda Ekholm (third round)
  Alexey Liventsov /  Yulia Prokhorova (fourth round)
  David Powell /  Lay Jian Fang (second round)
  Mohamed El-Beiali /  Nadeen El-Dawlatly (second round)
  Lubomír Jančařík /  Iveta Vacenovská (third round)
  He Zhi Wen /  Sara Ramírez (third round)
  Grigory Vlasov /  Yana Noskova (third round)
  Gaston Alto /  Camila Arguelles (first round)
  Carlos Machado /  Shen Yanfei (third round)
  Gustavo Tsuboi /  Gui Lin (second round)
  Pak Sin-hyok /  Kim Hye-song (quarterfinals)
  Simon Gauzy /  Carole Grundisch (second round)
  Gençay Menge /  Melek Hu (third round)
  Luis Diaz /  Gremlis Arvelo (first round)
  Ovidiu Ionescu /  Bernadette Szőcs (third round)
  Padasak Tanviriyavechakul /  Suthasini Sawettabut (second round)
  Ľubomír Pištej /  Barbora Balážová (fourth round)
  Rodrigo Gilabert /  Ana Codina (second round)
  Hugo Calderano /  Caroline Kumahara (third round)
  János Jakab /  Szandra Pergel (fourth round)
  Saheed Idowu /  Onyinyechi Nwachukwu (first round)
  Alberto Mino /  Melanie Diaz (second round)
  Andrei Filimon /  Elizabeta Samara (second round)
  Chaisit Chaitat /  Nanthana Komwong (second round)
  Soumyajit Ghosh /  Mouma Das (second round)
  Pavel Platonov /  Katsiaryna Baravok (second round)
  Yaroslav Zhmudenko /  Tetyana Sorochynska (second round)
  Aissa Belkadi /  Islem Laid (first round)
  José Ramírez /  Andrea Estrada (second round)
  Segun Toriola /  Olufunke Oshonaike (first round)
  Hector Gatica /  Mabelyn Enriquez (second round)
  Sami Kherouf /  Lynda Loghraibi (second round)
  Felipe Olivares /  Natalia Castellano (first round)
  Žolt Pete /  Gabriela Feher (third round)
  Tomislav Pucar /  Lea Rakovac (second round)
  Gustavo Gómez /  Katherine Low (second round)
  Diego Rodríguez /  Janina Nieto (second round)
  Tomáš Konečný /  Hana Matelová (third round)
  Tomislav Kolarek /  Tian Yuan (third round)
  Matīss Burģis /  Ni Xialian (second round)
  Thavisack Phathaphone /  Seangdavieng Douangpanya (second round)
  Gonzalo Lorenzotti /  Maria Lorenzotti (first round)
  Eric Glod /  Sarah de Nutte (second round)

Draw

Finals

Top half

Section 1

Section 2

Section 3

Section 4

Bottom half

Section 5

Section 6

Section 7

Section 8

References

External links
Main Draw
Qualifying Draw

Mixed doubles